Anis Ben Slimane (born 16 March 2001) is a professional footballer who plays as a midfielder for Danish Superliga club Brøndby IF and the Tunisia national team.

Slimane had a tumultuous youth career, playing for eight different clubs in twelve years, but finally settled at AB where he made his senior debut in 2018. The following season, he departed for Brøndby IF and was included in the U19-squad, but he would garner break-out attention in the second half of the 2019–20 season as he established himself as part of the first team.

Born in Denmark, Slimane has dual citizenship and made appearances for both Denmark U19 and Tunisia U20. He represents Tunisia at senior international level.

Career

Early career
Slimane was born in Copenhagen and lived in the Vesterbro neighbourhood during his youth. He started playing for the lower levels of Vesterbro club BK Vestia at age 7, which was the club located most closely to his home. After a few months he moved to the KB academy due to his classmate playing there; a team his classmate's father also coached. Later, Slimane and his classmate signed with the FA 2000 academy, where they were joined by some other talented players. Because some clubs were hesitant to create first teams and second teams, Slimane moved to different clubs in Copenhagen, who were willing to commit to youth football at a higher level. The following year, him and his classmate moved to Herfølge Boldklub, where they were for a short period, before moving first to B.93, where they reunited with the group of talented youth players from FA 2000. During his time at B.93, Slimane played in a UEFA European Club Championship tournament, where he impressed and therefore signed with the Brøndby IF academy.

Slimane was twelve years old when he moved to Brøndby. He played for their academy teams for one and a half years before moving back to play for KB at the under-13 level because of excessive travelling time to Brøndby after he and his family had moved to Høje Gladsaxe. Slimane's second stint at KB was, however, unsuccessful, and he, therefore, began to play for Lyngby Boldklub. He played in Lyngby's youth for six months before being signed by local club Akademisk Boldklub (AB) at under-14 level, where he once again reunited with his old classmates. Slimane stayed at AB for four years, ending his journeyman youth career. There, he played for four years, breaking into the first team during his final time at the club. In an interview with the Brøndby IF website, Slimane described how he was among Denmark's greatest youth football prospects during his first years of playing, but those different circumstances meant that he had to fight for his breakthrough into professional football. During this period, he was close to retiring from football but his family and friends' support helped him through the difficult periods. During one summer, where he played in AB's youth academy, he experienced a large growth spurt in which he grew 15 cm, which enabled him to become more dominant physically and helped him develop as a player.

In January 2018, Slimane left on a one-week trial with German Bundesliga club SC Freiburg. He made his first-team debut for AB on 7 April 2018 in a 2–1 home win over IF Lyseng, coming on as an 80th-minute substitute for Nichlas Rohde. Slimane made a total of 18 league appearances for AB in which he scored two goals.

Brøndby

2019–20 
Slimane joined Brøndby IF at under-19 level in June 2019, after he had impressed for the AB first-team in the Danish 2nd Division, the third tier of the Danish football pyramid. In January 2020, he was selected to participate in Brøndby's first-team training camp in Portugal, where he made his first appearance for the senior side in a pre-season friendly against Swedish side IFK Norrköping, impressing in front of scouts from Arsenal and Manchester United.

On 16 February 2020, Slimane made his professional debut in an away match against OB in the Danish Superliga as a starter, which Brøndby won 2–0. The following week, he made his first assist, a cross into the box which Samuel Mráz slotted home in a 2–3 loss to AaB. On 8 March 2020, he scored his first goal for Brøndby in a 2–2 draw away against FC Nordsjælland; a match played behind closed doors at Right to Dream Park due to guidelines implemented by Danish authorities during the COVID-19 pandemic. After the match, Slimane expressed his regret in not being able to celebrate his goal in front of fans.

2020–21: Danish Superliga champions
On 3 July 2020, Slimane signed a new contract with Brøndby, keeping him at the club until 2024. After struggling to find his way to the starting lineup during the first half of the 2020–21 season, he scored the winning goal on 13 December against SønderjyskE after coming on as a substitute for Simon Hedlund in the 77th minute.

On 1 February 2021, Slimane was fined and temporarily withdrawn from the Brøndby squad after breaking coronavirus quarantine guidelines. According to Slimane, he had picked up a female friend at a party and the police had showed up. He subsequently tested negative for COVID-19 twice and was included in the first team again on 3 February. He made his return to the pitch on 7 February as a starter in a 1–1 home draw against AaB.

On 24 May, Slimane scored Brøndby's second goal in their 2–0 win over Nordsjælland. The result confirmed Brøndby as Danish Superliga champions for the first time in 16 years.

2021–22
Slimane made his European debut on 17 August 2021 in the UEFA Champions League play-off first leg against Red Bull Salzburg, which ended in a 1–2 loss. He scored his first goal of the season on 29 August as Brøndby beat Midtjylland 2–0 – their first win of the season.

International career
Slimane has represented the Denmark national under-19 football team, as well as the Tunisia national under-20 football team.

On 1 October 2020, Slimane was called up to Mondher Kebaier's senior Tunisia squad for the two friendlies against Sudan and Nigeria. He scored in his debut, the third goal in a 3–0 win over Sudan.

Slimane was called up to the Tunisia squad for the 2022 World Cup in Qatar on 14 November 2022. On 22 November 2022, he made his debut in a major tournament in Tunisia's opening World Cup game against his country of birth, Denmark, starting in the 0–0 draw at Education City Stadium.

Career statistics

Club

International

Scores and results list Tunisia's goal tally first, score column indicates score after each Slimane goal.

Honours
Brøndby
Danish Superliga: 2020–21

References

External links

Anis Ben Slimane at bold.dk

2001 births
Living people
Footballers from Copenhagen
Citizens of Tunisia through descent
Tunisian footballers
Tunisia international footballers
Danish men's footballers
Denmark youth international footballers
Danish people of Tunisian descent
Kjøbenhavns Boldklub players
FA 2000 players
Herfølge Boldklub players
Boldklubben af 1893 players
Lyngby Boldklub players
Akademisk Boldklub players
Brøndby IF players
Danish 2nd Division players
Danish Superliga players
Association football midfielders
2021 Africa Cup of Nations players
2022 FIFA World Cup players